The National Food Safety and Quality Service (SENASA) is an independent agency of the Argentine government charged with surveillance, regulation and certification of products of animal and plant origin and the prevention, eradication and control of diseases and plagues that affect them .

SENASA formally comes under the Secretariat of Agriculture, Livestock, Fishing and Food, a division of the Ministry of Economy.

SENASA has 24 regional and 1 metropolitan supervising offices in all the country; however, its head office is located in Buenos Aires.

See also 
 Food Administration

External links
 Official website

Regulation in Argentina
Food safety organizations
Medical and health organisations based in Argentina
Phytosanitary authorities